Maria Popova (born 28 July 1984) is a Bulgarian-born, American-based essayist, book author, poet, and writer of literary and arts commentary and cultural criticism that has found wide appeal both for her writing and for the visual stylistics that accompany it.

In 2006, she started the blog Brain Pickings, an online publication that she has fought to maintain advertisement-free. The blog, renamed to The Marginalian upon its 15th birthday in 2021, features her writing on books, the arts, philosophy, culture, and other subjects.

In addition to her writing and related speaking engagements, she has served as an MIT Futures of Entertainment Fellow, as the editorial director at the higher education social network Lore, and has written for The New York Times, The Atlantic, Wired UK, and other publications. Since 2010, she has resided in Brooklyn, New York. She is the creator of "The Universe in Verse", a large-scale annual celebration of science and the natural world through poetry.

Early life 
Maria Popova was born on 28 July 1984 in Bulgaria. Popova's parents are ethnic Bulgarians who, as  noted by Bruce Feiler for The New York Times, "met as teenage exchange students in Russia ... [h]er father ... an engineering student who later became an Apple salesman ... her mother ... studying library science". In interview, Popova states that in childhood, one of her grandmothers often read to her from a collection of encyclopedias.  As recounted in interview to Geoff Wolinetz of Bundle.com, Popova first worked when she was about 8 years old, making the Bulgarian yarn folk art dolls called martenitsas, worn beginning on the first of March where Popova describes selling them on the street as children would sell drinks at a lemonade stand.

Undergraduate education and early work 
Popova graduated from the American College of Sofia in Bulgaria, a secondary school, in 2003. She relocated to attend the University of Pennsylvania, where she earned a degree in communications, though for years, up to 2012, her grandmother had wanted her to get an MBA. Popova paid for her tuition by working four part-time jobs on top of a full college course load: as an advertising representative for The Daily Pennsylvanian, as an intern for a local writer, as an employee for a work-study job at the Annenberg Center for the Performing Arts, and as a staff member for a small start-up advertising agency in Philadelphia.

In 2005, while Popova worked at an advertising agency, she noticed that her co-workers were circulating information within the advertising industry around the office for inspiration. However, Popova thought creativity was better sparked with exposure to information outside of the industry one was familiar with. In an effort to stir creativity, she regularly sent emails to the entire office containing five things that had nothing to do with advertising, but were meaningful, interesting, or important. Because of the popularity of the emails, Popova felt that there was an "intellectual hunger for that sort of cross-disciplinary curiosity and self-directed learning."

She enrolled in a night class to learn web design, took Brain Pickings online, and let the project grow organically.

Relocation to the United States 
Popova describes the period of coming to the U.S. to Hannah Levintova of Mother Jones; in this 2012 interview she states:I didn't immigrate. I'm here on a visa, and I'm not an American citizen. I don't know if you followed the ... situation in 2007 and 2008? ... Every year, the government has a visa quota—they will give, say, 65,000 H1-B work visas for foreigners who are going to work in the country for an American company. And so, normally, they would open up the application process, and the quota would run out in the first three weeks... So, after graduation, I had a job [lined up], and we applied for that visa, but that was the year “Visagate” happened: The first day of applications, for the first time in history, the government got three times their quota on the very first day. So, they panicked and thought the only thing to do was to make it a raffle for everyone that applied on the first day, and then automatically reject everyone after that. So, we’d filed for the first day, but I was in the two-thirds that didn’t get it, so the whole envelope got returned unopened. So then I got the OPT [Optional Practical Training]—which entitles you to a year’s worth of work with a company within the scope of your major. We tried again in 2008, and same thing—the whole envelope got returned unopened. So, I had to leave the country! I went back to Bulgaria for a year. Popova describes returning to Bulgaria in 2008 in interview to the Bulgarian news journal Capital, and how she and a trio of friends organized a conference modeled after the American TED Talks, which they called "TEDxBG". Popova further describes the outcome of the events—her eventual visa receipt—to Mother Jones: "When the application process lightened up... I moved to LA—which I really resented more than anyone’s ever resented a city in the history of resenting cities. And now I’m finally in New York, and I’m here to stay." As of 2012, she was living in Brooklyn.

Work as a writer

Popova has written for The Atlantic, Wired UK, GOOD, The Huffington Post, and NiemanLab.

In 2006, she began the blog Brain Pickings as an email sent each week to seven of her friends. Krista Tippett in On Being describes it as "[n]ow a website, Twitter feed, and weekly digest... cover[ing] a wide variety of cultural topics: history, current events, and images and texts from the past." It includes several sections and has graphics, photographs, and illustrations in addition to written content. As of December 2012, The Guardian was reporting that the blog had "1.2 million readers a month and 3m page views". Anne-Marie Slaughter describes Popova's blog as "like walking into the Museum of Modern Art and having somebody give you a customized, guided tour."

Popova is also author of Figuring, published by Random House in 2019., and The Snail with the Right Heart: A True Story, published by Enchanted Lion Books in 2021, and co-editor of A Velocity of Being: Letters to A Young Reader, published by Enchanted Lion Books in 2018, and

In Figuring, which appeared at No. 5 on the New York Times bestseller list upon publication, Popova examines connections between a variety of scientists, writers, and artists, many of them women, and how they created meaning in their lives. Figuring won the 2019 Los Angeles Times Book Prize in the Science and Technology category.

Side projects and partnerships
In addition to running Brain Pickings, Popova has a number of side projects. She maintains a  Twitter account, and a newsletter.  In 2012, she created the "Literary Jukebox", a sub-site where she matches quotes from books with songs. "Music, for me, is an enormous trigger of mnemonic associations – of time, place, mood, emotion, the smell of fresh-cut grass behind your best friend’s house when you were 18 and first heard that song."

Popova also has various partnerships with prominent organizations. She is an MIT Futures of Entertainment Fellow. Additionally, Popova serves as the editorial director at the higher education social network Lore, run by Noodle. She edits Explore, a partnership site with the Noodle educational search company.

Content selection and output
Popova filters through the large amounts of content she reads each day through a detailed selection process. When choosing content for Brain Pickings, she asks herself three things: 

 
When choosing material to publish on Brain Pickings, she aims to "share content that is meaningful. Often, it’s timeless." Popova also seeks out content that has narrative. As she states, "Curation is a form of pattern recognition – pieces of information or insight which over time amount to an implicit point of view." Popova publishes this information in tweet form when she does not have much to add.  On the other hand, she publishes this as blog posts when she feels she can deepen the subject with historical background or additional materials.

Awards and recognitions
Maria Popova has received numerous instances of media recognition for her work. In 2012, she was named number 51 of the 100 most creative people in business by Fast Company magazine. Popova was featured in 30 under 30 by Forbes as one of the most influential individuals in Media and was listed on “The 140 Best Twitter Feeds of 2012 List” by Time magazine. Popova's work has also been spotlighted and profiled in publications such as The New York Times.

Criticism

Affiliate advertising
Popova has been very vocal about her dislike for traditional advertising, and has repeatedly expressed her pride on being advertising-free: 

In 2013, Popova received criticism on how she championed her site to be "ad-free" and a "labor of love" that requires reader donations to sustain itself, while she covertly received revenue from affiliate advertising from Amazon. Tom Bleymaier, founder of a startup in Palo Alto, California, wrote a post on an anonymous Tumblr blog calling Popova out for her actions. Using his own calculations, Bleymaier extrapolated that Popova could make anywhere between $240,000 and $432,000 a year with these affiliate advertisements.

This received much media attention from sources such as Reuters and PandoDaily.

This incident has sparked a more general debate on the Internet about whether or not affiliate advertisements are "sneaky" or "deceptive". Popova has since updated her donation page on Brain Pickings to acknowledge the fact that she receives income from affiliate advertisements.

Curator's Code

In 2012, Popova created The Curator's Code, a project (now suspended) by Popova with input from designer Kelli Anderson. The Curator's Code is a code of conduct for curators on the web to use. This proposed method is an attempt to codify source attribution on the internet  to ensure that the intellectual labor of information discovery is honored. Under the code, the "via" symbol indicates direct discovery, where the "hat tip" symbol indicates an indirect link of discovery.

The Curator's Code was controversial, and received mixed responses. The announcement of this project elicited feedback from one blogger who "worr[ied] about the meaning of curation". In that blog post, Marco Arment stated that "codifying 'via' links with confusing symbols is solving the wrong problem". Most criticism of The Curator's Code voiced uncertainty about its ability to solve the problems of online attribution. Some critics argued that the problems of online attribution are not due to a lack of codified syntax, but rather due to the "economics and realities of online publishing".

Personal life
Popova has sought to maintain a degree of personal anonymity, with emphasis on her writing rather than on herself.

Popova has participated in amateur bodybuilding. She states in an interview that she "fell into" the world of bodybuilding during her freshman year at the University of Pennsylvania when her dormitory's resident adviser recommended that she compete in a bodybuilding show, although she no longer competes.

References

Further reading 
 
 
  (under Creative Commons license)
  Earlier used citation whose content appears to have been plagiarised from The New York Times and other sources.

External links 

 The Marginalian (formerly Brain Pickings)
 Popova's Twitter account
 Curator's Code, now suspended
 Explore (the original Lore collaboration)

1984 births
Living people
Bulgarian women writers
Bulgarian expatriates in the United States
Bulgarian bloggers
Bulgarian women bloggers
People from Brooklyn
American women bloggers
American bloggers
The Daily Pennsylvanian people
Annenberg School for Communication at the University of Pennsylvania alumni
Shorty Award winners
21st-century American women